Rome Township is one of the fourteen townships of Athens County, Ohio, United States. The 2010 census found 1,320 people in the township.

Geography
Located in the eastern part of the county, it borders the following townships:
Bern Township - north
Wesley Township, Washington County - northeast corner
Decatur Township, Washington County - east
Troy Township - southeast corner
Carthage Township - south
Lodi Township - southwest corner
Canaan Township - west
Ames Township - northwest corner

No municipalities are located in Rome Township, although three unincorporated communities lie in the township: Guysville in the south, New England in the northwest, and Stewart in the center.

Name and history
Rome Township was established in 1811.

Statewide, other Rome Townships are located in Ashtabula and Lawrence counties.

In 1833, Rome Township had a store and several mills.

Government
The township is governed by a three-member board of trustees, who are elected in November of odd-numbered years to a four-year term beginning on the following January 1. Two are elected in the year after the presidential election and one is elected in the year before it. There is also an elected township fiscal officer, who serves a four-year term beginning on April 1 of the year after the election, which is held in November of the year before the presidential election. Vacancies in the fiscal officership or on the board of trustees are filled by the remaining trustees.

References

External links
County website

Townships in Athens County, Ohio
Townships in Ohio
1811 establishments in Ohio
Populated places established in 1811